The flathead galaxias (Galaxias depressiceps) is a galaxiid of the genus Galaxias, found primarily in the Taieri River catchment in Otago, New Zealand. This species should not be confused with the Australian fish with the same common name: Galaxias rostratus.

References
 
 NIWA June 2006

Galaxias
Endemic freshwater fish of New Zealand
Taxa named by Bob McDowall
Fish described in 1996